The Sony Xperia XZ2 Premium is an Android smartphone manufactured and marketed by Sony. Part of the Xperia X series, the device was announced to the public on April 16, 2018 featuring a 4K HDR display and a MotionEye™ Dual Camera.

Hardware

Design and Build
The Xperia XZ2 Premium comes with the new "Ambient Flow" design. It consists of a metal side frame,  metal top and bottom edges that together make up the chassis of the phone, and scratch-resistant front and back glass panels made of Corning's Gorilla Glass 5. The most defining change in the XZ2 Premium, as well as the  Xperia XZ2 and XZ2 Compact, is the placement of the camera on the back. It is now placed on the center, as opposed to being placed on the top left side like on the previous Xperia smartphones. The NFC antenna is at the top of camera. The front of the phone consists of dual front-firing stereo speakers, one on the top bezel and the other on the bottom bezel, along with a 13 MP front camera, ambient light sensor, proximity sensor and notification LED.

Display and Performance
The Xperia XZ2 Premium has a 4K HDR display, making it the second smartphone to feature such a display. It is HDR10 compliant, but has no Dolby Vision support. The  IPS LCD screen has a pixel density of 765 ppi when rendered in 4K resolution and features Sony's TRILUMINOS display and X-Reality for mobile technology.

It is powered by the Qualcomm Snapdragon 845, built on 10 nm process technology with 8 custom Kryo 385 processors (4x 2.7 GHz and 4x 1.7 GHz), 6 GB of LPDDR4X RAM and uses the Adreno 630 for graphics rendering. The device also has an internal storage of 64 GB and comes in single-SIM and dual-SIM versions, with both featuring LTE Cat. 16 with 3x carrier aggregation, a 4x4 MIMO antenna design and a total of 8 antennas. It also has microSD card expansion of up to 512 GB (uses SIM 2 slot).

Camera
The Xperia XZ2 Premium has the Triple Image Sensing technology that started with the Xperia XZ as standard. It is composed of the image sensing (CMOS sensor with PDAF), distance sensing (Laser AF sensor) and color sensing (RGBC-IR sensor) systems, featuring a hybrid autofocus that utilizes Phase Detection (PDAF) to lock focus on a subject within 0.03 seconds, and also includes phase and contrast detection along with predictive motion tracking. It also has a laser autofocus sensor for fast tracking and locking focus on a subject, as well as an RGBC-IR (RedGreenBlueClear-InfraRed) color sensor that assists the white balance function of the camera by providing additional data about the light conditions of the surrounding environment. It also has SteadyShot with Intelligent Auto in addition to the five-axis sensor-shift image stabilization first seen in the Xperia XZ. The Motion Eye Dual Camera in the Xperia XZ2 Premium also has Predictive Capture. When it detects fast-paced movement, the camera automatically captures a maximum of four photos before the shutter button is pressed, and lets the user select the best one afterwards. This is done without any user intervention and is possible due to the same built-in RAM chip on the image sensor used in capturing the 960 fps super slow-motion videos.

Battery
The Xperia XZ2 Premium is powered by a non-removable 3540 mAh battery. Charging and data transfer is handled by a USB-C port with support for USB 3.1 and Qi Wireless Charging. It also has Qualcomm's QuickCharge 3.0 and Qnovo adaptive charging technology built-in. This allows the device to monitor the cell's electrochemical processes in real time and adjust charging parameters accordingly to minimize cell damage and extend the battery unit's lifespan. It also comes with Battery Care, a Sony proprietary feature, that controls the charging process of the phone by learning and recognizing the user's charging patterns, preventing the phone from damaging the battery's cells from excessive heat due to overcharging. For example, when charging overnight, Battery Care stops the initial charge to 90 percent and then continue charging until full where it left off the next day.

Audio and Connectivity
The Xperia XZ2 Premium has no standard 3.5 mm audio jack but it has LDAC, an audio coding technology developed by Sony, that enables the transmission of 24bit/96 kHz High-Resolution (Hi-Res) audio content over Bluetooth at up to 990 kbit/s, three times faster than conventional audio streaming codecs, to compatible audio devices. Other connectivity options include Bluetooth 5 with aptX and Low Energy, NFC, dual-band Wi-Fi a/b/g/n/ac with 2x2 MIMO antennas, Wi-Fi Direct, MirrorLink, screen casting via Miracast, Google Cast, DLNA, GPS (with A-GPS), GLONASS, BeiDou and Galileo satellite positioning. The Xperia XZ2 Premium has no FM radio.

Software
The Sony Xperia XZ2 Premium launched with the Android 8.0 Oreo operating system, along with Smart Stamina battery saving modes and Sony's proprietary multimedia apps. It is scheduled to get Android 9 Pie on November 7, 2018.

References

Android (operating system) devices
Sony smartphones
Mobile phones introduced in 2018
Mobile phones with multiple rear cameras
Mobile phones with 4K video recording